Vishwaraj Pratap Singh  (18 October 1932 – 14 May 2007) was prince and later held  the officially, the titular Raja of Kawardha State from 1959-1971. He was eldest son of Raja Dharamraj Singh. He was a member of Legislative Assembly of Madhya Pradesh from Kawardha constituency as a member of Akhil Bharatiya Ram Rajya Parishad from 1962-67.

He was born at Kawardha on 18 October 1932 to Raja Dharamraj Singh of Kawardha. He was educated at Rajkumar College, Raipur of which he also served as a member of executive committee in later life. He was married and had issues. He became the  Raja of Kawardha upon death of his father 20 August 1959 and held the title till the privy purse and titles were abolished by the Government of India in 1971. He died on 14 May 2007. He is survived by two daughter and a son. His elder daughter Manjari Kumari is married to  Kunwar Rudra Dev Singh of Orchha, the second daughter Vasundhara Kumari is married to Rawal Sanjai Singh, the titular Rawal of Bissau. His son Yogeshwar Raj Singh, now holds the title-in-pretence of the Raja of Kawardha.

References

1932 births
2007 deaths
Madhya Pradesh MLAs 1962–1967
Indian royalty
Rajas of Kawardha